Sudini Jaipal Reddy (16 January 1942 – 28 July 2019) was an Indian politician who was the Member of Parliament in the Lok Sabha of India for five terms. He represented the Chevella constituency of Telangana and was a member of the Indian National Congress. He served as a Union Minister for Information and Broadcasting in the I. K. Gujral cabinet in 1998. In 1999 he returned to Indian National Congress after 21 years. In 2004 he was re-elected to 14th Lok Sabha from Miryalaguda Lok Sabha Constituency and then he served as a Union Minister for Information and Broadcasting and Union Minister for Urban Development in the United Progressive Alliance-1. In 2009 he was re-elected to the 15th Lok Sabha from the Chevella constituency and served as a Union Minister for Urban Development and Union Minister for Petroleum and Natural Gas. He was the Union Minister for the Ministry of Earth Sciences and the Ministry of Science and Technology from 29 October 2012 to 18 May 2014.

Personal life
Reddy was born in Nermatta, a village in Chandur Mandal in Nalgonda District in Telangana State but is actually from Madgula, Mahabub Nagar district ( now Ranga Reddy Dist.) in Telangana. He had been polio-stricken since he was 18-months old, and used crutches to walk.

He had an M.A. from the Osmania University, Hyderabad. He had been an agriculturist. He married Lakshmi on 7 May 1960. The couple had two sons and one daughter.

Career
Reddy was a student leader during his college life and in 1970s he joined the Indian National Congress. He became an MLA of Kalwakurthy in Andhra Pradesh.

Reddy was an MLA of Kalwakurthy between 1969 and 1984, a constituency in Andhra Pradesh for four terms. He quit his membership of the Congress Party to protest against the emergency and joined the Janata Party in 1977 and later on its splinter Janata Dal.
He was the general secretary of the Janata Party from 1985 to 1988. He was elected to the 8th Lok Sabha in 1984 from Mahbubnagar Lok Sabha. He rejoined the Congress Party in 1999 and was elected to the 14th in 2004 from Miryalaguda constituency and the 15th in 2009 from Chavella. He was also a member of the Rajya Sabha on two occasions, 1990–1996 and 1997–1998.

He also held the position of leader of opposition in the Rajya Sabha for a year from June 1991 to June 1992.He served as the minister for Information and Broadcasting in the government on two occasions: in 1997–1998 under I. K. Gujral and from 2004 under Manmohan Singh with additional responsibility for Culture. He also served as the minister for Urban Development and Petroleum and Natural Gas.

He acted as the spokesman for several parties of which he has been a member and was awarded the Outstanding Parliamentarian Award in 1998. He was the first from South India and the youngest parliamentarian to achieve this award.

Removal from the Oil Ministry

The last cabinet reshuffle of the UPA-II government took place on 28 October 2012. Reddy was shifted from his current ministry to the Science and Technology ministry after he differed on the gas allocation to Reliance and his refusal to accept demands of Reliance. The oil ministry had imposed a fine of 7000 Rs. crores on Mukesh Ambani's company for the sharp drop in production of gas and violations mentioned in CAG's 2011 report. Further, the oil ministry did not approve company's US$7.2 billion stake in deal with BP. Opposition parties including the BJP, SP, and AAP said that he was removed owing to alleged pressure from the corporate houses, particularly from the Reliance group of Industries. However he refuted the claims and said that he needed to understand the new portfolio.

Death
Reddy died on 28 July 2019 at AIG Hospital, Gachibowli in Hyderabad of pneumonia.

References

External links

An interview
Homecoming after 24 yrs for veteran spokesman – Editorial
Small column titled Harsh Reality

Detailed Profile: Jaipal Sudini Reddy

|-

|-

|-

|-

|-

|-

|-

|-

|-

|-

|-

|-

1942 births
2019 deaths
Indian National Congress politicians
Janata Party politicians
India MPs 1984–1989
India MPs 1998–1999
India MPs 1999–2004
India MPs 2004–2009
Union Ministers from Telangana
Members of the Cabinet of India
India MPs 2009–2014
Telugu politicians
Indian politicians with disabilities
Janata Dal politicians
People from Telangana
Telangana politicians
Andhra Pradesh MLAs 1978–1983
People from Nalgonda district
Lok Sabha members from Andhra Pradesh
Osmania University alumni
Leaders of the Opposition in the Rajya Sabha
Rajya Sabha members from Andhra Pradesh
People from Ranga Reddy district
People from Mahbubnagar district
Ministers for Information and Broadcasting of India
Culture Ministers of India
Petroleum and Natural Gas Ministers of India